Jon L. Dybdahl is a professor of theology and a college administrator. Inaugurated in 2002, he is the immediate past president of Walla Walla University in College Place, Washington. In 2006, he announced his retirement from that position, effective the end of the 2005–2006 academic year.

Prior to his presidency, Dybdahl spent six years as a pastor and evangelist in Thailand, where he founded an adult education center and Chiangmai Adventist Academy. Dybdahl has Bachelor's, Master's and Doctorate degrees in theology from Pacific Union College, Andrews University and Fuller Theological Seminary.  Dybdahl is considered one of the Seventh-day Adventist church's foremost experts on world mission.

Books
Missions: A Two-Way Street (1986)
Old Testament Grace (1989)
Exodus: God Creates a People (The Abundant Life Amplifier series) (1995)
Hosea-Micah: A Call to Radical Reform (The Abundant Life Amplifier series) (1996)
Passport to Mission (1999) [co-authored with Erich Baumgartner, Pat Gustin, and Bruce Moyer, on behalf of the Institute of World Mission
Adventist Mission in the 21st Century (1999)
A Strange Place for Grace: Discovering a Loving God in the Old Testament (2006)
Hunger: Satisfying the Longing of Your Soul

External links
Walla Walla University
Dybdahl to retire
Dybdahl joins Edinburgh 2010 Planning Group
Empower Ministry

Fuller Theological Seminary alumni
Pacific Union College alumni
Seventh-day Adventist religious workers
Living people
American Seventh-day Adventists
Andrews University alumni
Walla Walla University
20th-century American writers
21st-century American writers
Year of birth missing (living people)